AEK Men's Volleyball Club is the volleyball team of the major Greek multi-sports club AEK. It was founded in 1982. AEK had its finest moment with coach Stelios Prosalikas when they reached the Final-4 of the Cup Winners Cup in 2000. The matches were held (9/10 March 2000) in Athens and AEK lost in the semifinal by Cuneo, but won 3–1 Galatasaray in the 3rd place game.

History
	

The men's volleyball department of AEK was originally founded in the 1930s, but soon it was disbanded and reopened in 1967 by Jason Platsi and participated in the C category of Athens. But not maintained and was reconstituted in 1982 to participate again in the C of Athens. Between 1985–86 participated in the second centre court and won rise, as in 1986–87 to A' local.

Since 1987–88, AEK struggling to National categories. They held Division C for 4 years until they won the championship with 22 victories in tantamount matches the 1990–91 marketing. The next year in the second division, he won again the upswing A2.

During the 1992–93 season, AEK participated for the first time in the A2 and missed the rise in the broad category in the process of massive with PAOK in Trikala. Mo was the same but in the next year (1993–94) which, with 19 victories in 22 games she got a ticket to the A1.

Our initial presence in the 'lounges' volleyball (1994–95) were unsuccessful because we achieved only 3 wins and returned at A2, but in order to win back the ticket of the rise in 1995–96.

The second half of the 90s until the beginning of the new millennium was the best year for kitrinomafro volleyball. The group not only participates in exactly A1, but the pioneers and even wins and a ticket to the European Cups in 1998–99 occupying the 5 position, while winning the Nationwide in the quarterfinal with 3–1 and reach the final of the Cup made in Greece Tower and lost to Olympiacos with a 3–1.

In 2000, AEK with coach Stelios Prosalikas reaches its peak, as has prevailed in the Final-4 of the Cup Winners Cup. The races held (9/10 March) in Athens. AEK lost in the semifinal by Cuneo, but won 3–1 Galatasaray in the small final and won the 3rd place.

Unfortunately since the downturn began in the 2001–02 marketing year, our team relegated at A2. In the last official match was in Georgios Moschos Indoor Hall, AEK earning Pangrati and celebrate the championship in her return to the A1. But we will not be able to stand in the great division as relegated again. The last two years the group fought at A2, but he won the Championship in 2005–06 and from 2006–07 will return to A1. In current season, AEK played in A1 Ethniki and finished the championship in 7th place.
During this season, AEK also managed to win the first domestic cup title in the men team's history. More specifically, AEK beat Foinikas Sirou with 3–2 in the final of the third Greek League Cup, after having defeated in the semi-final the big favorite and host of the final-four tournament Ethnikos Alexandroupolis (0–3).

Season to season
AEK has played 14 times in A1 Ethniki (first division). They played in A1, in season 1994–95 for first time. From 1996–97 to 2001–02 was playing continuously in A1. The last years was going up and down the divisions.

Honours

Domestic competitions 
Greek League Cup
 Winners (1): 2013–14
Greek Cup
 Runners-up (1): 1998–99
Greek A2 Ethniki
 Winners (5) (record): 1993–94, 2002–03, 2005–06, 2008–09, 2017–18

European competitions 
  CEV Cup
  Third (1): 1999–00

Team
Season 2022–2023

Technical and managerial staff

Notable players

Domestic Players

Andreas Andreadis
Sotiris Amarianakis
Theoklitos Karipidis
Thanassis Moustakidis
Konstantinos Stivachtis
Michalis Alexandropoulos
Athanasios Maroulis
Akis Chatziantoniou
Nikos Samaras †
Sotirios Tsergas
Ioannis Fakas
Christos Voloudakis
Makis Kanellos
Georgios Kotsilianos
Giannis Chaslamaidis
Ilias Lappas
Konrad Guzda
Georgios Tzioumakas

European Players

Inoslav Krnić

Jaromír Koláčný

Christian Strehlau
Fabrice Bry

Balša Radunović

Bela Bunford
Edin Škorić
Đula Mešter
Dejan Brđović

Jordi Gens
Julián Torres

Yuriy Filippov
Oleg Mushenko

Non-European Players

Pablo Meana
Oscar Vizzari
Santiago Darraidou

Celso

Jorge Payan

Jayson Jablonsky

Carlos Tejeda
Fredy Cedeño

Players whose names are italicized still play for the team

Notable coaches
  Dimitris Kazazis
  Stelios Prosalikas
  Akis Flaounas
  Zoran Gajić
  Jorge Elgueta

International record

Sponsorships
Great Sponsor: N/A
Official Sport Clothing Manufacturer: Macron
Official Broadcaster: N/A

See also
 AEK Women's Volleyball Club

References

External links
A.E.K. Official Website – Men's Volleyball 

Volleyball
Greek volleyball clubs
Volleyball clubs established in 1982